Phoebe Putney Memorial Hospital is a hospital in Albany, Georgia.

History  
The hospital was created using a donation of $25,000 from Judge Francis Flagg Putney. At his request, the hospital was named after his mother, Phoebe. The hospital opened on August 1, 1911.

In 1986, the hospital was at the center of a criminal case after a GBI investigation following an unusually high percentage of cardiac arrests. Nurse Terri Rachals was indicted on twenty counts of aggravated assault, and convicted on one count as "guilty but mentally ill" of aggravated assault with intent to murder. Potassium chloride was injected into a bag of frozen plasma which was then introduced to a patient's body.

In 2010, the facility bought out the area's only other hospital, Palmyra Medical Center, for $195 million. PMC was owned by Hospital Corporation of America, the country's largest hospital operator. The acquisition ended a lawsuit over Palmyra's provision of obstetric services.

Because of the merger, the hospital agreed to a settlement with the Federal Trade Commission in 2013 that for the next 10 years, PPMH and the Hospital Authority of Albany-Dougherty County, without first notifying the FTC, would not acquire another medical facility within Dougherty, Lee, Baker, Terrell, Worth, and Mitchell Counties. PPMH and the hospital authority also agreed for the next five years to not file an objection to a Certificate of Need granted to a general acute care hospital within the six county region.

On June 7, 2018, the hospital announced its president and CEO Joel Wernick would be retiring in May 2019 after 30 years in that position.

References

External links
 Phoebe Putney Memorial Hospital Official Website
 Phoebe Foundation

Hospital buildings completed in 1911
Hospitals in Georgia (U.S. state)
Buildings and structures in Albany, Georgia
1911 establishments in Georgia (U.S. state)